George Blumberg (April 29, 1903 – January 18, 1960) was an American businessman and politician from New York.

Life
He was born on April 29, 1903, in Brooklyn, New York City, the son of Max Blumberg and Lena (Gurian) Blumberg. He was Jewish. He engaged in the lumber business.

Blumberg was a member of the New York State Assembly (Kings Co., 6th D.) in 1926. In 1932, he became an insurance broker. He was a member of the New York State Senate (7th D.) in 1933 and 1934.

Later he was President of the Coastline Fuel Oil Corporation in Flushing, Queens.

He died on January 18, 1960; and was buried at the Mount Lebanon Cemetery in Glendale, Queens. His niece was Joan Wolosoff, wife of Sol Wachtler, the Chief Judge of the New York Court of Appeals.

Sources

1903 births
1960 deaths
Republican Party New York (state) state senators
Businesspeople from Brooklyn
American people of Lithuanian-Jewish descent
Jewish American people in New York (state) politics
Republican Party members of the New York State Assembly
20th-century American Jews
20th-century American politicians
Burials in New York (state)